Nan Allely is a former Irish lawn and indoor bowler.

Bowls career
Allely won the 1981 World Outdoor Bowls Championship pairs Gold in Toronto when partnering Eileen Bell.

She became a British champion after winning the 1978 pairs at the British Isles Bowls Championships.

References

Female lawn bowls players from Northern Ireland
Living people
Bowls World Champions
Bowls players at the 1982 Commonwealth Games
Bowls players at the 1986 Commonwealth Games
Commonwealth Games competitors for Northern Ireland
Year of birth missing (living people)